The 2003 All-Ireland Minor Football Championship was the 72nd staging of the All-Ireland Minor Football Championship, the Gaelic Athletic Association's premier inter-county Gaelic football tournament for boys under the age of 18.

Derry entered the championship as defending champions, however, they were defeated in the Ulster Championship.

On 12 October 2003, Laois won the championship following a 2-10 to 1-9 defeat of Dublin in the All-Ireland final. This was their third All-Ireland title overall and their first title in six championship seasons.

Results

Connacht Minor Football Championship

Semi-finals

Final

Leinster Minor Football Championship

Rob robin

		
		
		
		
		

Quarter-final

Semi-finals

Final

Munster Minor Football Championship

Rob robin

Semi-finals

Final

Ulster Minor Football Championship

Rob robin

Semi-final

Final

All-Ireland Minor Football Championship

Quarter-finals

Semi-finals

Finals

Championship statistics

Miscellaneous

 The All-Ireland final is contested by two teams from the same province for the first time ever. Laois become the first "back door" champions, having earlier been defeated by Dublin in the Leinster final.

References

2003
All-Ireland Minor Football Championship